Alauddin Ali was a Bangladeshi film score composer. He has scored music for 154 films. The following is a complete list of films he has scored for:

1970s

1980s

1990s

2000s

2010s

Year unknown

Background score only

Non-film songs

Songs for television

References

Sources
 

Discographies of Bangladeshi artists